The Walton Ranger Station in Glacier National Park was constructed to "Standard Ranger Station, GNP" plans as a year-round station at Walton to replace the old Paola Ranger Station and to place a station near US 2, a well-traveled highway through the park. The National Park Service Rustic structure is typical of its time period.

References

External links

 at the National Park Service's NRHP database

Ranger stations in Glacier National Park (U.S.)
Park buildings and structures on the National Register of Historic Places in Montana
Government buildings completed in 1932
National Park Service rustic in Montana
Historic districts on the National Register of Historic Places in Montana
National Register of Historic Places in Flathead County, Montana
National Register of Historic Places in Glacier National Park
Log buildings and structures on the National Register of Historic Places in Montana
1932 establishments in Montana